Otter Island is a small island located  southwest of Saint Paul Island, Alaska, in the Bering Sea. It is a member of the Pribilof Islands. Its land area is 165.21 acres (0.6686 km2) and there is no resident population. The island is closed to hunting.

References
Otter Island: Block 1042, Census Tract 1, Aleutians West Census Area, Alaska United States Census Bureau

Pribilof Islands
Islands of the Aleutian Islands
Uninhabited islands of Alaska
Islands of Alaska
Islands of Unorganized Borough, Alaska